Ambhader is a village in Charsadda District, Pakistan. The village is situated along the Swat River, on the road that connects Sardaryab with Shabqadar and the district capital, Charsadda.

Geography and climate
The village of Ambhader sits on the Peshawar valley of the Iranian plateau, near the junction of the Hindu Kush mountains with the Eurasian Plate.  

The village has a humid subtropical climate, with hot summers and relatively cold winters, and moderate rainfall.

Populated places in Charsadda District, Pakistan